Ganna Puchkova-Areshka (alternate listings: Anna Puchkova, Hanna Puchkova; born April 20, 1978) is a Belarusian sprint canoer who competed in the mid to late 2000s. She won a bronze medal in the K-2 1000 m event at the 2006 ICF Canoe Sprint World Championships in Szeged.

Puchkova-Areshka also finished ninth in the K-2 500 m event at the 2004 Summer Olympics in Athens.

References

1978 births
Belarusian female canoeists
Canoeists at the 2004 Summer Olympics
Living people
Olympic canoeists of Belarus
ICF Canoe Sprint World Championships medalists in kayak
21st-century Belarusian women